Catocala grotiana, or Grote's underwing, is a moth of the family Erebidae. The species was first described by James S. Bailey in 1879. It is found in the US from Arizona, north through Utah into Colorado. It has also been spotted in Washington and in the western US north and east of California.

The wingspan is 70–80 mm. Adults are on wing from August to September depending on the location. There is probably one generation per year.

The larvae feed on Populus and Salix species.

References

External links
Species info

Moths described in 1879
grotiana
Moths of North America